Quiz is a British drama television serial by James Graham, based on Graham's play of the same name commissioned by William Village and the book Bad Show: the Quiz, the Cough, the Millionaire Major by Bob Woffinden and James Plaskett. It is directed by Stephen Frears and consists of three hour-long episodes. The series focuses on Charles Ingram, a former army major in the Royal Engineers, and how he unexpectedly won the 
£1,000,000 jackpot on the quiz show Who Wants to Be a Millionaire? in 2001, followed by a criminal trial in which he and his wife were convicted of cheating their way to success.

The series received positive reviews from critics. Released during the height of the COVID-19 pandemic lockdowns worldwide, Quiz received a large audience — similar to the Netflix documentary Tiger King — with the first episode being seen live by an average audience of 5.3 million in the UK. While the show was still airing, Charles Ingram's Wikipedia article was one of the most viewed on the site.

Summary 
In 2001, at the height of the public obsession with Who Wants to Be a Millionaire?, a British army major named Charles Ingram and his wife, Diana, apparently swindled the British game show. The morning after Ingram bumbled his way to a million pounds, broadcaster ITV and production company Celador realized something had been amiss: a series of coughs by the Ingrams' alleged accomplice, Tecwen Whittock, may have led Ingram to the answers. It was a massive scandal, resulting in a court case that found all three guilty.

Episodes

Cast 
 Matthew Macfadyen as Charles Ingram
 Michael Sheen as Chris Tarrant
 Sian Clifford as Diana Ingram
 Mark Bonnar as Paul Smith
 Helen McCrory as Sonia Woodley QC
 Michael Jibson as Tecwen Whittock
 Aisling Bea as Claudia Rosencrantz
 Trystan Gravelle as Adrian Pollock
 Elliot Levey as David Briggs
 Risteárd Cooper as David Liddiment
 Jasmyn Banks as Nicola Howson
 Andrew Leung as Kevin Duff
 Martin Trenaman as DS Ferguson
 Nicholas Woodeson as Nicholas Hilliard QC
 Paul Bazely as Lionel from Legal

Production 
The scenes in the Who Wants to be a Millionaire? studio were filmed in a set constructed at Wimbledon Studios. Scenes were also filmed outside Southwark Crown Court and inside a former court building in Hammersmith.

Reception
On Rotten Tomatoes, the series holds a 95% "Certified Fresh" approval rating based on 36 reviews, with an average rating of 7.57/10. The website's consensus reads, "With clever writing, a slick production, and a pitch perfect Michael Sheen, Quiz crafts a captivating snapshot of a wild scandal that will keep viewers on their toes."

Ingram himself praised the series, calling it "balanced".

References

External links 
 

2020s British drama television series
2020 British television series debuts
2020 British television series endings
2020s British television miniseries
English-language television shows
ITV television dramas
Television series by Left Bank Pictures
Television series set in 1997
Television series set in 1998
Television series set in 1999
Television series set in 2000
Television series set in 2001
Television series set in 2003
True crime television series
Who Wants to Be a Millionaire?
Television series set in the 1990s
Television series set in the 2000s
Television series impacted by the COVID-19 pandemic